Milenko Kiković (born 19 October 1954) is a Serbian former football manager and player.

Playing career
During the late 1970s and early 1980s, Kiković played for Rad in the Yugoslav Second League, scoring 15 times in 58 appearances.

Managerial career
After hanging up his boots, Kiković served as manager of numerous clubs in his homeland, most notably winning the Serbia and Montenegro Cup with Sartid Smederevo in the 2002–03 season. He was also manager of BASK, Radnički Niš, BSK Borča, and lastly Sloboda Užice (September 2014–April 2015).

Honours
Sartid Smederevo
 Serbia and Montenegro Cup: 2002–03

References

External links
 
 

Association football forwards
FK Bor managers
FK BSK Borča managers
FK Čukarički managers
FK Čukarički players
FK Obilić managers
FK Obilić players
FK Rad managers
FK Rad players
FK Radnički Niš managers
FK Sloboda Užice managers
FK Sloboda Užice players
FK Smederevo managers
OFK Mladenovac players
People from Sjenica
Serbian football managers
Serbian footballers
Serbian SuperLiga managers
Yugoslav footballers
Yugoslav Second League players
1954 births
Living people